Joseph M'Bouroukounda (7 September 1938 – 1 October 2017) was a Gabonese boxer. He competed in the men's featherweight event at the 1972 Summer Olympics. He was the first person to represent Gabon at the Olympics.

References

External links
 

1938 births
2017 deaths
Gabonese male boxers
Olympic boxers of Gabon
Boxers at the 1972 Summer Olympics
Featherweight boxers
21st-century Gabonese people